Sarah Walker is a freelance writer & editor, with particular expertise in the buy to let property field. She is best known for her role in To Buy or Not to Buy.

Biography
When she was younger, Sarah’s parents moved many times throughout England and Scotland and she developed a natural feel for different homes and relocation. Sarah graduated from Aberdeen University in 1996 with a master's degree in English, and then spent 8 months in Southern Italy, teaching in a private school and learning the language. She became seriously interested in the housing market when she bought her own flat and subsequently worked for three years as an estate agent, valuing and selling residential properties in Berkshire and Surrey. Her natural aptitude for advising clients on how to make the most of their homes, together with her study of interior design and soft furnishings, resulted in her setting up her own home image consultancy.

In 2005, Sarah began writing features for property and lifestyle magazines. Since then, she has continued to write for industry publications and has also produced a wide range of marketing and PR content for leading UK property service companies. In recent years, she has worked closely with various entrepreneurs, ghostwriting and editing books that support their business enterprises.

Broadcasting
In the summer of 2003, Walker auditioned for the BBC and was chosen to be the property stylist for 10 one-hour specials of the already successful To Buy or Not to Buy. She was then invited to co-present the second series with Kristian Digby and in 2007 finished filming the sixth series, co-presenting with Simon Rimmer. She has also presented Trading Up, featured on Colin McAllister and Justin Ryan's 20 Quickest Ways.... on Five, co-presented The Property Market in Bulgaria for the Overseas Property Channel, and appeared a number of times on BBC Breakfast and BBC Radio 5 Live in her role as a property expert.

As a speaker, theatre host and expert panelist, Walker has appeared at property shows and exhibitions around the UK, including BBC Good Homes, Invest in Property, RETV Live, Homes Overseas, The Home & Garden Show, Viva Italia and Landlord & Buy to Let Show.

References 

Living people
British television presenters
Alumni of the University of Aberdeen
Year of birth missing (living people)